L. S. Shauger was a member of the Wisconsin State Assembly during the 1929 and 1931 sessions. Additionally, he was Chairman (similar to Mayor) of Ogema, Wisconsin and County Chairman of Price County, Wisconsin. He was a Republican. Shauger was born in Outagamie County, Wisconsin in 1878.

References

People from Outagamie County, Wisconsin
People from Ogema, Wisconsin
Republican Party members of the Wisconsin State Assembly
Mayors of places in Wisconsin
1878 births
Year of death missing